Kweda is a small town located in the Wheatbelt region of Western Australia, about  east of the town of Brookton.

History
The government was planning to build a railway line between Brookton and Kunjin (near Corrigin), in 1913, and one of the proposed stations was a "Quandadine Siding", located near Quandadine Pool in the Avon River. Marshall Fox, the district surveyor, proposed creating a townsite here in 1914, and land was resumed for this purpose later that year.

By the time the railway line was opened in 1915 the name of the siding had been changed to Kweda, and this was the name applied when the townsite was gazetted in 1918. This name may be derived from "Queeda", a Noongar name for the Casuarina tree.

References

External links
 Pictures taken at Kweda (Don Copley)

Towns in Western Australia
Wheatbelt (Western Australia)